This is a survey of the postage stamps and postal history of Liberia.

Liberia is a country on the west coast of Africa, bordered by Sierra Leone, Guinea, Côte d'Ivoire, and the Atlantic Ocean. The capital is Monrovia.

First stamps

Began as a settlement of the American Colonization Society (ACS), Liberia declared its independence on July 26, 1847. The first stamps of Liberia were issued in 1860, depicting a sitting Liberty with a sailing vessel in the background.

References

Further reading 
Bileski, Kasimir. A Century of Liberian Philately, 1971.

External links
Stamps of Liberia at Internet Archive.

Communications in Liberia
Liberia